Edgewood is the name of some places in the U.S. state of Pennsylvania:
Edgewood, Allegheny County, Pennsylvania
Edgewood, Northumberland County, Pennsylvania

es:Edgewood (Pensilvania)